The 2012 Minnesota House of Representatives election was held in the U.S. state of Minnesota on November 6, 2012, to elect members to the House of Representatives of the 88th Minnesota Legislature. A primary election was held in several districts on August 14, 2012.

The Minnesota Democratic–Farmer–Labor Party (DFL) won a majority of seats, defeating the majority of the Republican Party of Minnesota. This was the first election for the Republicans since it won a majority of seats in the 2010 election, after losing a majority to the DFL in the 2006 election. The new Legislature convened on January 8, 2013.

Primary election results

General election

Opinion polling

Results

District results

See also
 Minnesota Senate election, 2012
 Minnesota gubernatorial election, 2010
 Minnesota elections, 2012

References

External links
 Color shaded map showing winning margin by district (PDF) at 2012 Election Maps, Minnesota Secretary of State

2012 Minnesota elections
Minnesota House of Representatives elections
Minnesota House of Representatives